The SuperSport Trophy was pre-season tournament played by 3 Albanian football teams, organized by SuperSport Albania. This is an unofficial tournament that has been held yearly since 2011. It is not sanctioned or recognized by official football bodies since the gameplay rules do not correspond to IFAB/FIFA laws of football.

Winners
2011 Skënderbeu Korçë

Editions

2011 SuperSport Trophy

Final Tournament Standings
3 points for win, 0 points for loss
2 points for penalty kick win, 1 point for penalty kick loss
Skënderbeu wins tournament

Scorers

Matches

Super